The Church of Jesus Christ of Latter-day Saints in the Samoan Islands refers to the Church of Jesus Christ of Latter-day Saints and its members on the Samoan Islands. In 1890, there were 30 members in the Samoan islands. As of 2021, there were 100,252 members in 205 congregations. The Samoan Islands has the second most LDS Church members per capita in the world, behind Tonga.

As of 2021, the LDS Church reported 83,740 members in 162 congregations in the country of Samoa, making it the largest body of LDS Church members in Oceania outside of Australia and New Zealand.

History

In 2019, church president Russell M. Nelson met with His Highness Tuimalealiifano Vaaletoa Sualauvi II of Samoa.

Schools
In addition to seminaries and institutes, there are a few primary schools and secondary schools operated by the Church of Jesus Christ of Latter-day Saints.
 Church College Pesega
 Sauniatu Primary School
 Church College Vaiola

Missions
The Samoa Apia Mission was formed June 17, 1888 and serves as the only mission for the Samoan Islands.

Temples

On August 5, 1983 the Apia Samoa Temple was dedicated by Gordon B. Hinckley.
The Pago Pago American Samoa Temple was announced by Russell M. Nelson on April 7, 2019.

See also
Church Educational System
 Religion in Samoa
 Religion in American Samoa

References

External links
 The Church of Jesus Christ of Latter-day Saints Official Site (Pacific)
 The Church of Jesus Christ of Latter-day Saints Official Site (Samoa)
 The Church of Jesus Christ of Latter-day Saints Newsroom (Pacific)
 ComeUntoChrist.org Latter-day Saints Visitor site
 Mormon Beginnings in Samoa: Kimo Belio, Samuela Manoa and Walter Murray Gibson by Spencer McBride
 Mormonism in Samoa: Cultural Dialogues Spring 2006. Jessica Goman. SIT Study Abroad